The Douai Martyrs is a name applied by the Catholic Church to 158 Catholic priests trained in the English College at Douai, France, who were executed by the English state between 1577 and 1680.

History
Having completed their training at Douai, many returned to England and Wales with the intent to minister to the Catholic population. Under the Jesuits, etc. Act 1584 the presence of a priest within the realm was considered high treason. Missionaries from Douai were looked upon as a papal agents intent on overthrowing the queen. Many were arrested under charges of treason and conspiracy, resulting in torture and execution. In total, 158 members of Douai College were martyred between the years 1577 and 1680. The first was Cuthbert Mayne, executed at Launceston, Cornwall. The last was Thomas Thwing, hanged, drawn, and quartered at York in October 1680. Each time the news of another execution reached the College, a solemn Mass of thanksgiving was sung.

Many people risked their lives during this period by assisting them, which was also prohibited under the Act. A number of the "seminary priests" from Douai were executed at a three-sided gallows at Tyburn near the present-day Marble Arch. A plaque to the "Catholic martyrs" executed at Tyburn in the period 1535 - 1681 is located at 8 Hyde Park Place, the site of Tyburn convent. 

They were beatified between 1886, 1929 and 1987, and only 20 were canonized in 1970. Today, British Catholic dioceses celebrate their feast day on 29 October.

Bl Alexander Crow 
Bl Anthony Middleton 
Bl Antony Page 
Bl Christopher Bales 
Bl Christopher Buxton 
Bl Christopher Robinson 
Bl Christopher Wharton
Bl Edmund Catherick  
Bl Edmund Duke 
Bl Edmund Sykes 
Bl Edward Bamber 
Bl Edward Burden 
Bl Edward James 
Bl Edward Jones 
Bl Edward Osbaldeston 
Bl Edward Stransham 
Bl Edward Thwing 
Bl Edward Waterson 
Bl Everald Hanse 
Bl Francis Ingleby 
Bl Francis Page 
Bl George Beesley 
Bl George Gervase 
Bl George Haydock 
Bl George Napper 
Bl George Nichols 
Bl Henry Heath 
Bl Hugh Green 
Bl Hugh More 
Bl Hugh Taylor 
Bl James Claxton 
Bl James Fenn 
Bl James Thompson 
Bl John Adams 
Bl John Amias 
Bl John Bodey 
Bl John Cornelius 
Bl John Duckett 
Bl John Hambley 
Bl John Hogg
Bl John Ingram 
Bl John Lockwood 
Bl John Lowe 
Bl John Munden 
Bl John Nelson 
Bl  John Nutter 
Bl John Pibush 
Bl  John Robinson 
Bl John Sandys 
Bl John Shert 
Bl John Slade 
Bl John Sugar 
Bl John Thules 
Bl Joseph Lambton 
Bl Lawrence Richardson 
Bl Mark Barkworth 
Bl Matthew Flathers 
Bl Montfort Scott 
Bl Nicholas Garlick 
Bl Nicholas Postgate 
Bl Nicholas Woodfen 
Bl Peter Snow 
Bl Ralph Crockett 
Bl Richard Hill 
Bl Richard Holiday 
Bl Richard Kirkman 
Bl  Richard Newport 
Bl Richard Sergeant 
Bl Richard Simpson 
Bl Richard Thirkeld 
Bl Richard Yaxley 
Bl Robert Anderton 
Bl Robert Dalby 
Bl Robert Dibdale 
Bl Robert Drury 
Bl Robert Johnson 
Bl Robert Ludlam 
Bl Robert Nutter 
Bl Robert Sutton 
Bl Robert Thorpe 
Bl Robert Wilcox 
Bl Roger Cadwallador 
Bl Roger Filcock 
Bl Stephen Rowsham 
Bl Thomas Alfield 
Bl Thomas Atkinson 
Bl Thomas Belson 
Bl Thomas Cottam 
Bl Thomas Maxfield 
Bl Thomas Palaser 
Bl Thomas Pilchard 
Bl Thomas Pormort 
Bl  Thomas Reynolds 
Bl Thomas Sherwood 
Bl  Thomas Somers 
Bl Thomas Sprott 
Bl Thomas Thwing 
Bl Thomas Tunstal 
Bl Thurstan Hunt 
Bl William Andleby 
Bl William Davies 
Bl William Filby 
Bl William Harrington 
Bl William Hart 
Bl William Hartley 
Bl  William Lacey 
Bl  William Marsden 
Bl William Patenson 
Bl William Southerne 
Bl William Spenser 
Bl  William Thomson 
Bl William Ward 
Bl William Way 
St Alban Bartholomew Roe 
St Alexander Briant 
St Ambrose Edward Barlow 
St Cuthbert Mayne 
St Edmund Arrowsmith 
St Edmund Campion 
St Edmund Gennings 
St Eustace White 
St Henry Morse 
St Henry Walpole 
St John Almond 
St John Boste 
St John Kemble 
St John Payne 
St John Southworth 
St John Wall 
St Luke Kirby 
St Ralph Sherwin 
St Robert Southwell 
Ven Edward Morgan 
Ven Thomas Tichborne 
 Bl Alexander Rawlins
Bl Edward Campion
 Francis Dickinson
 James Bird
James Harrison
John Finglow
John Goodman
John Hewitt
Matthias Harrison
Miles Gerard
 St Polydore Plasden
Richard Horner
 Robert Leigh
 Robert Morton
Robert Watkinson
 Roger Dickinson
Thomas Felton
Thomas Ford
Thomas Hemerford
Thomas Holford
William Dean
William Freeman
 William Gunter
 Bl William Richardson

The Douay Martyrs School in Ickenham, Middlesex is named in their honour.

See also
Douai Bible
Douai, France
List of Catholic martyrs of the English Reformation

References

External links
English-Scottish-Irish-Welsh Martyrs

Catholic martyrs of England and Wales
English College, Douai alumni
English beatified people
Welsh beatified people